Paul Hanson may also refer to:
Paul D. Hanson (born 1939), American biblical scholar
Paul Hanson (guitarist) (born 1957), American guitarist
Paul Hanson (bassoonist) (born 1961), American bassoonist

See also
Poul Hansen (disambiguation)